Lorna Wighton (born June 2, 1958 in Toronto, Ontario) is a Canadian former ice dancer. With partner John Dowding, she won three gold medals at the Canadian Figure Skating Championships and finished sixth at the 1980 Winter Olympics.

Results
(with John Dowding)

References

1958 births
Canadian female ice dancers
Figure skaters at the 1980 Winter Olympics
Living people
Olympic figure skaters of Canada
Figure skaters from Toronto